The Sale is a 2014 Iranian social drama film  produced & directed by Hossein Shahabi  This Film the first time screened in 21st film festival of vesoul France.

Synopsis
Forough is a middle aged woman whose husband has temporarily married with another woman. Even though that was kept secret from her, but his action is considered legal in Iran. Now the husband is in prison, due to not being able to pay second wife’s “Mehrieh” (the bride’s marriage portion).  The second wife intends to receive her Mehrieh by asking the court’s permission to sell his house. Forough, the first wife, in order to not lose her home, intends to sell all she has to pay for her husband’s debt and release him from the jail...

Production
 Producer: Hossein Shahabi
 Production Manager: Mohammad Reza Najafi
 Procurement Manager:Morteza Khosravi
 Produced in Baran Film House, Iran, 2014

Plot
 Hossein Shahabi
 Siavash Shahabi

Starring
 Fariba Khademi
 Nasim Adabi
 Mahsa Abiz
 Mohammad Kart
 Maryam Sarmadi
 Ali Habibpoor
 Ahmad Shahabi
 Mohammad Akbari

Crew
 Director Of Photography: Hooman Salmasi
 Sound Recorder: Mohammad Salehi
 Editors: Hossein Shahabi, Hossein Eyvazi
 Assistant director: Narjes Ebrahimi
 Music: Hossein Shahabi, Babak Parsian
 Costume Designer: Bahareh Amini
 Director of Consulting: Bahareh Ansari
 Planner: Narjes Ebrahimi
 Assistsnts Director: Idin Pedari, Siavash Shahabi, Javad Kahani

International presence
 Companies at the 21st international film festival of Asian cinema, Vesoul, France (2015) 
 Companies at the 15th Iranian film festival of Sweden (2015)

References

 Festival Scope Retrieved 11 March 2013
 persianfilmfestival Retrieved 22 April 2013
 nasimonline Retrieved 22 April 2013
 mehr news Retrieved 22 April 2013
 Organization of Iranian cinema Retrieved 22 December 2014
 letterboxed Retrieved 13 October 2014

External links 
The sale review (by David J. Fowlie )
bani film news Banifilm Retrieved 13 February 2014
isna news Banifilm Retrieved 13 June 2014

Iranian independent films
Iranian drama films
Films set in Tehran
Films shot in Iran
Films directed by Hossein Shahabi